The Sharp pocket computer character sets are a number of 8-bit character sets used by various Sharp pocket computers and calculators in the 1980s and mid 1990s.

Character sets

PC-12xx and PC-14xx series 
The Sharp PC-14xx series (like the Sharp PC-1403 (1986), PC-1403H or PC-1475) uses an 8-bit extended ASCII character set. With minor exceptions the lower half resembles the 7-bit ASCII character set. The upper half contains a full set of half-width Katakana glyphs as well as a number of graphical and mathematical symbols. The Japanese glyphs are not documented and are available only after enabling an undocumented Japanese mode.

PC-150x series 
The Sharp PC-1500 series uses a 7-bit character set derived from ASCII. Differences show the Unicode code point below the glyph.

PC-160x series 
The Sharp PC-1600 supports two character sets. In "MODE 0", the character set resembles code page 437, whereas in "MODE 1" certain code points are changed to become compatible with the character set of the predecessor, the PC-1500.

PC-E220 series 
The Sharp PC-E220 uses an 8-bit character set where the lower half resembles ASCII and the upper half contains various Greek letters, super- and subscript digits as well as various mathematical symbols.

PC-E500 series 
The Sharp PC-E500 (1989) and PC-E500S (1995) use an 8-bit character set almost identical to the IBM PC code page 437. Differences are highlighted.

See also 
 Calculator character sets

Notes

References 

Calculator character sets